Curraghboy is a village in County Roscommon, Ireland. It has one public house and two grocery shops. It also has an indoor handball alley, Roman Catholic church and a national (primary) school.

See also
 List of towns and villages in Ireland

References

Towns and villages in County Roscommon